Boryszyn  is a village in the administrative district of Gmina Lubrza, within Świebodzin County, Lubusz Voivodeship, in western Poland. 

The village has a population of 210.

References

External links

 Fortified Front Odra-Warta rivers, Boryszyn Loop

Boryszyn